RK Poreč (Rukometni Klub Poreč) is a team handball club from Poreč, Croatia. Currently, RK Poreč competes in the Croatian First League of Handball (The "Dukat Premijer Liga) and the Croatian Handball Cup.

Crest, colours, supporters

Kits

Notable players
    Goran Čarapina
    Krešimir Maraković
    Vedran Mataija
   Ivan Stevanović
    Vedran Banić
    Teo Čorić
    David Miličević
   Igor Totić
     Stevan Popov
    Filip Gavranović
    Mario Šporčić
     Vladislav Veselinov
    Goran Gorenac
     Milan Ivančev
    Ilija Lovrinović
     Mario Galijot
     Stefan Vujić
    Vladimir Gruičić
    Irfan Kovač
    Tomislav Sladoljev

Notable former coaches
  Saša Ilić

External links
Official website of RK Poreč

Croatian handball clubs